Berthold Huber (born 15 February 1950) is a German former trade union leader.

Born in Ulm, Huber was apprenticed as a toolmaker, and worked at Kässbohrer.  He joined IG Metall, and in 1978 he became head of the Kässbohrer works council.  He began working full-time for the union in 1990, and in 1991 became director of its president's office.  In 1998, he became the director of its Baden-Wuerttemberg region, and was elected as the union's vice president in 2003.  He became president of the union in 2007, and was also elected as president of the International Metalworkers' Federation, then moving to its successor, the IndustriALL Global Union.

In 2012, Huber retired from IG Metall, becoming deputy chair of the board of Volkswagen.  In 2015, he served as acting chair, in which post he dealt with the fallout from the Volkswagen emissions scandal.  He served on the board of Audi for nearly twenty years, retiring in 2018.  He also serves on the boards of the Max Planck Society and the Academy of Science and Engineering, and chair of the council of the Siemens Foundation.

References

1950 births
Living people
German trade unionists
People from Ulm
Works councillors